Antonio Cioffi (born 19 December 2002) is an Italian professional football player who plays as a forward for  club Pontedera, on loan from Napoli.

Early life 
Cioffi was born in Maddaloni in Campania, growing up in San Felice a Cancello, where he started playing football before joining Napoli's academy in 2012.

Club career 
After coming through Napoli's youth ranks, Cioffi was called to the first team by Gennaro Gattuso as he had just turned 18, in the very early days of January 2021.

After featuring on the bench several times, he made his professional debut for Napoli on 17 January 2021, coming in as a substitute of Lorenzo Insigne in the 6–0 Serie A win against Fiorentina.

In the following season, while he mostly featured for the Under-19 squad, Cioffi also made his debut in Coppa Italia on 13 January 2022, as he took the place of Stanislav Lobotka in the injury time of the match against Fiorentina, as his side eventually suffered a 2-5 loss after extra time.

On 9 July 2022, Cioffi was officially sent on a season-long loan to Serie C club Pontedera.

References

External links

2002 births
Living people
Italian footballers
Association football forwards
Sportspeople from the Province of Caserta
Footballers from Campania
S.S.C. Napoli players
U.S. Città di Pontedera players
Serie A players
Serie C players